Stephen Ashley Sherbourne, Baron Sherbourne of Didsbury,  (born 15 October 1945) is a British Conservative who was Political Secretary for Prime Minister Margaret Thatcher and Chief of Staff to Conservative leader Michael Howard. He is currently a non-executive director of Smithfields Consultants.

He was born in Manchester, and studied Philosophy, Politics and Economics (PPE) at St Edmund Hall, Oxford.

He is known for his interest for liberal democracy and the free market.

Knighted in 2006 having previously been appointed a Commander of the Order of the British Empire (CBE) in the 1988 New Year Honours. He was created a life peer on 12 September 2013 taking the title Baron Sherbourne of Didsbury, of Didsbury in the City of Manchester.

References

1945 births
Living people
Alumni of St Edmund Hall, Oxford
Conservative Party (UK) life peers
Commanders of the Order of the British Empire
Politicians from Manchester
Knights Bachelor
Life peers created by Elizabeth II